Jenny Dürst (born 25 March 1999) is a Swiss tennis player.

Dürst has a career-high singles ranking by the Women's Tennis Association (WTA) of 332, achieved on 26 September 2022. She also has a career-high WTA doubles ranking of 200, achieved on 12 September 2022.

Dürst won her first major ITF title at the 2022 TCCB Open in the doubles draw, partnering Weronika Falkowska.

ITF Circuit finals

Singles: 2 (2 runner–ups)

Doubles: 17 (9 titles, 8 runner–ups)

References

External links
 
 

1999 births
Living people
Swiss female tennis players
21st-century Swiss women